Luis Coronado (born 20 September 1969) is a Guatemalan weightlifter. He competed in the men's middleweight event at the 1992 Summer Olympics.

References

1969 births
Living people
Guatemalan male weightlifters
Olympic weightlifters of Guatemala
Weightlifters at the 1992 Summer Olympics
Place of birth missing (living people)
20th-century Guatemalan people